Hilary Lunke (born Hilary Homeyer on June 7, 1979) is a retired American professional golfer best known for winning the 2003 U.S. Women's Open.

Homeyer was born in Edina, Minnesota. She attended Stanford University and became a member of the LPGA Tour in 2002. On July 7, 2003, Lunke defeated Kelly Robbins and Angela Stanford in an 18-hole playoff to win the U.S. Women's Open for her first and only LPGA win. Lunke was also the first player to win the U.S. Open after advancing through local and sectional qualifying.

Lunke's husband, Tylar, was her caddie on that July day. They married on November 2, 2002. Lunke gave birth to her first child, Greta , in November 2007. She had her second child, daughter Marin, in October 2009. Then she had her third child in 2012, Linnea.

Lunke joined the LPGA Player Executive Committee in 2006, and was selected vice president in 2007 and president in 2008. At the end of 2008, she was named the winner of the William and Mousie Powell Award, given to an LPGA member "who, in the opinion of her playing peers, by her behavior and deeds, best exemplifies the spirits, ideals and values of the LPGA."

Lunke retired at the end of the 2008 season.

Professional wins

LPGA Tour wins (1)

LPGA Tour playoff record (1–0)

Major championships

Wins (1)

1Defeated Stanford and Robbins in an 18-hole playoff: Lunke 70, Stanford 71, and Robbins 73.

Results timeline

^ The Women's British Open replaced the du Maurier Classic as an LPGA major in 2001.

CUT = missed the half-way cut
WD = withdrew
"T" = tied for place

U.S. national team appearances
Amateur
Espirito Santo Trophy: 2000
Curtis Cup: 2000 (winners)

References

American female golfers
Stanford Cardinal women's golfers
LPGA Tour golfers
Winners of LPGA major golf championships
Golfers from Minnesota
People from Edina, Minnesota
Golfers from Austin, Texas
People from Hopkins, Minnesota
1979 births
Living people